The Real Love Boat is an American reality romance television series premiered on CBS, airing Wednesday nights beginning October 5, 2022, and is based on the original romantic comedy/drama television series The Love Boat that aired on ABC from 1977 to 1986 and later on moved to UPN (now The CW) for two more seasons from 1998 to 1999 as Love Boat: The Next Wave. The series takes place on Princess Cruises luxury passenger cruise ship Regal Princess in the Mediterranean. 

The series is produced by Eureka Productions in association with Buster Productions. Chris Culvenor, Paul Franklin, Eden Gaha, Jay Bienstock and Wesley Dening serve as executive producers for Eureka while Scott Helmstedter is EPing on behalf of Princess Cruises. Rebecca Romijn and Jerry O'Connell serve as hosts and perform the vocals for the song featured in the series' opening credits.

After four episodes with low ratings, CBS moved the show to Paramount+ starting November 2.

An Australian version of the show premiered on Network 10 (CBS' sister network through Paramount Global) from October 5, 2022. It is hosted by Darren McMullen. It also featured Paolo Arrigo as the captain as well.

Crew 

 Rebecca Romijn and Jerry O'Connell as Your Hosts
 Paolo Arrigo as Your Captain
 Ezra Freeman and Ted Lange as Your Bartenders
 Matt Mitcham as Your Cruise Director
 Jill Whelan as Your Captain's Daughter

Cast

Cast progress

Episodes

References

External links 
 
 
 

Television series by Eureka
Television series set on cruise ships
CBS original programming
Television series by CBS Studios
English-language television shows
2020s American reality television series
2022 American television series debuts
2022 American television seasons
American dating and relationship reality television series
Television shows filmed in Spain
Television shows filmed in the United Kingdom
Television shows filmed in France
Television shows filmed in Italy
Television shows filmed in Greece
Television shows filmed in Turkey
Television shows filmed in Montenegro
Princess Cruises
Paramount+ original programming